The McDonnell Douglas DC-X-200 was a proposed airliner from McDonnell Douglas in the late 70's.

It was to complement McDonnell Douglas DC-10, with a smaller capacity. It was basically a shortened DC-10 (keeping the same fuselage cross-section), with a capacity reduced from 270 to 220 passengers in a 3 class layout, and only two engines under the wings, dropping the DC-10's central engine. They were General Electric CF6s as in the DC-10, but in a slightly uprated version. It addition, the wing was a new design, with higher aspect ratio and supercritical airfoil. 
It was to compete with Airbus A310 and Boeing 767, developed in the same era and of similar size.

MDD was working with NASA on the aerodynamic design, and wind tunnel testing were conduced. However the project was dropped in the summer of 1978 due to low commercial opportunities.

The NASA report lists the main design features: 
 Length : 43.41 m  
 Wingspan : 46.84 m  
 height : 15.24 m  
 Wing area : 220 m2 
 MTOW : 132 tonnes
 engines : Two CF6-45 with 200 kN thrust each

References 

McDonnell Douglas DC-10
1970s United States airliners
Low-wing aircraft